"I Hit It First" is a song by American singer Ray J. It features vocals from rapper Bobby Brackins and was produced by record producer Nic Nac, who helped to write the song with Ray J and Brackins.

Controversy
The song is a reference to Ray J's past relationship with American reality star Kim Kardashian. In spite of Ray J's comments about the subject of the song, there are numerous allusions to his stint with his former girlfriend and bragging about it in his song openly. The cover art for the single features a pixelated image of Kardashian. Kardashian's then husband and rapper, Kanye West and former husband and basketball player, Kris Humphries are indirectly referenced in the song, with the chorus saying: "She might move onto rappers, and ball players, but we all know I hit it first". Ray J also hints toward Kanye West with the lyrics "But now baby chose to go West". Also mentioned in the song is the sex tape which he made with Kardashian that launched her career as a reality star.

Charts

Release history

References 

2013 singles
Ray J songs
2013 songs
Songs written by Nic Nac
Songs written by Ray J
Songs written by Bobby Brackins